The 2018 Cook Islands Round Cup is the 45th recorded edition of the Cook Islands Round Cup, the top association football league of the Cook Islands organised by the Cook Islands Football Association. This season kicked off on 17 August 2018, and ended on 24 November 2018, and were competed by six teams from the island of Rarotonga in triple round-robin format. The winner will qualify for the 2019 OFC Champions League.

Standings

References

Cook Islands Round Cup seasons
Cook Islands
football